Rijsenburg is a former village and municipality in the Dutch province of Utrecht. Presently, it is a part of the single town of Driebergen-Rijsenburg.

The former municipality of Rijsenburg existed from 1818 to 1931, when it merged with Driebergen, to create the new municipality of Driebergen-Rijsenburg. Since 2006, Driebergen-Rijsenburg has been part of the new municipality of Utrechtse Heuvelrug.

References

Former populated places in the Netherlands
Populated places in Utrecht (province)
Former municipalities of Utrecht (province)
Utrechtse Heuvelrug